Tennis ball cricket (Softball Cricket) is a variant of cricket played using a tennis ball. It is popular in South Asian cricket-playing nations, such as India, Pakistan, Bangladesh Sri Lanka, and Nepal. It is also played by South Asian expatriates living in Middle-Eastern countries such as the UAE, Oman, Bahrain, Qatar, and Saudi Arabia, and by emigrants in the United States, Poland and Canada. It is mainly played by youngsters as a tennis ball is easier to play with compared to a conventional hard cricket ball. It is also safer as the tennis ball is soft and less likely to cause injury. It is strongly believed that the variant of tennis (softball) cricket is originated from India.

Tennis Cricket is becoming popular in European countries recently. In 2022, Poland experience a finer quality of amateur level of tennis cricket season. Warsaw, the capital of Poland, had 12 teams participating in back to back four different full-fledged tournaments. The Softball Cricket Club (SCC) in Poland has made immense progress in making the tennis cricket culture popular in Poland. Recently, the number of participants has doubled and likely to continue in near future. Indian Expat (Mr. Kumar - Head of Development - EUROPE (ITCF)  in Poland is working to introduce and add Tennis Cricket as sports in Polish Schools.

History
Tennis ball cricket was pioneered in densely populated cities in India and Pakistan, such as Calcutta, Mumbai, Karachi and Lahore , where cricket grounds and protective gear are not common. It became popular in the early 1990s, and is responsible for grooming the talents of the cricketers such as Sachin Tendulkar, Wasim Akram and Shoaib Akhtar at an early age.

Rules and playing style
The rules of this game can vary significantly from standard cricket, and often the rules of regular cricket do not apply as they normally would. The number of overs in the game can vary from six to twenty-five. Considering that the ball is not as hard as a professional cricket ball, the use of protective gear like gloves, pads and helmets is optional.

The playground is wherever they can conjure one, from a backyard to a beach to a relatively-uncrowded street, the courtyard of a school or a church, the driveway of a residential building, the open space near a public facility

Pads, gloves and abdominal guards are not required, since no one has suffered concussion from being hit by a tennis-ball. When the stumps are a wall, wicket-keepers are surplus to requirements. In a narrow gully, you can do with many fewer fielders than the standard eleven.

 Popular brands of tennis balls in India include NODENS, Cosco or Vicky. In other countries, such as the U.S. and Canada, Wilson or Slazenger tennis balls are common.

Tournaments and competitions
As tennis ball cricket matches are usually short compared to first-class matches or ODIs, they are especially suited to recreational weekend play. In South Asian cities and villages, it is usually played out on the streets and roads or on agricultural fields. In Middle Eastern countries, it is usually played in the open desert, while in the US and Canada, baseball diamond grounds are utilized. In Poland it is generally played on football grounds, with a minor changes in the boundary measurements. 

This rudimentary form of cricket is, therefore, one of India's most ubiquitously played sports and attracts a huge turnout, particularly in the countryside. And it doesn’t stay confined to the gullies and the backyards. Tennis-ball cricket tournaments have begun to be organized, and many have turned into hugely popular events. Their revenues are generated from modest team entry fees and occasional donations (mostly given by politicians)

Tennis ball cricket has recently reached a new peak thanks to competitions like the 10PL held at the renowned Sharjah Cricket Stadium. India defeated Pakistan in a friendly match that was arranged for the first time during the tournament's 2020 edition. Many international cricketers, including Robin Uthappa of India and Dwayne Bravo of West Indies, were part of the tournament as a brand ambassador and mentors in the previous editions.

Players 
Many international cricketers started their journey as a tennis ball cricketer. Sunil Gavaskar used to play gully cricket and that's the reason for him scoring more in the 'V' region on field. Kedar Jadhav climbed up the ranks playing in tennis ball tournaments.

See also
Tape ball

References

External links
 INTERNATIONAL TENNIS CRICKET FEDERATION
TennisCricket.in A tennis ball cricket news website.
BBC Sports article 
Cricbay Non-profit cricket community promoting Cricket in the San Francisco Bay Area.
SFSCA South Florida Softball Cricket Association.
TCA  Non-profit organization promoting organized cricket in the Bay Area. 
Columbia Cricketers Columbia Cricketers
http://wmcl.net/

Street cricket